Midway is an unincorporated community and census-designated place (CDP) in Chaves County, New Mexico. The population was 971 at time of the 2010 census.

Geography
U.S. Route 285 forms the western edge of the CDP, leading northwest to Roswell and south  to Artesia. New Mexico State Road 2 runs through the center of the community, joining US 285 at the CDP's northwest corner and running southeast  to Hagerman.

Demographics

Education
It is in the Roswell Independent School District.

References

Census-designated places in New Mexico
Census-designated places in Chaves County, New Mexico